Statistics of Lebanese Premier League for the 2002–03 season.

Overview
Tripoli SC won the championship.

League standings

Playoff

References
RSSSF

Leb
2002–03 in Lebanese football
Lebanese Premier League seasons
2002–03 Lebanese Premier League